Porporato may refer to:

 Amilcare Porporato, an Italian-American engineer currently the Addy Professor of Civil and Environmental Engineering at Duke University
 Giuseppe Filippo Porporato, Bishop of Saluzzo from 1741 until his death in 1781
 Jean Porporato, an Italian-born French automobile racing driver